Mukayle is a town in the central Hiran region of Somalia.

References
MUKAYLE 

Populated places in Hiran, Somalia